The American Bank Building is a 15-floor building in Portland, Oregon, U.S.  It stands  tall, and was built in 1913. It replaced the Marquam Building.

History
The building was the tallest in the city for 14 years until surpassed by the Public Service Building in 1927.  Designed by A. E. Doyle, it is located at 621 SW Morrison Street, and was formerly known as the Northwestern National Bank Building. The building was added to the National Register of Historic Places in 1996. In 2000, Transamerica Asset Management paid $21.7 million to City Center Retail to acquire the building. Transamerica then sold it to SKB Portland Office Investments LLC in 2002 for $22.3 million, who then sold the tower in 2008 for $35.2 million to LaeRoc Partners. In July 2014, the building was sold for $45 million to Independencia S.A., a Chilean company.

References

External links
 

1913 establishments in Oregon
A. E. Doyle buildings
Bank buildings on the National Register of Historic Places in Oregon
Commercial buildings completed in 1913
National Register of Historic Places in Portland, Oregon
Portland Historic Landmarks
Skyscraper office buildings in Portland, Oregon
Southwest Portland, Oregon